Brave New World is the thirteenth studio album by Styx, released in 1999. It is the band’s first studio album to feature drummer Todd Sucherman, replacing John Panozzo, who died in 1996 and the last album to feature keyboardist/vocalist Dennis DeYoung. This is the last album that bassist Chuck Panozzo is credited as a full-time member, he would continue with the band as a part-time member. The album peaked at #175 on the Billboard 200 and reached the top 10 on the Top Internet Albums chart. However, its position on the Billboard charts was the lowest from a Styx album of new material since 1973's The Serpent Is Rising.

Jerry Goodman who is featured on violin as a special guest, used to play with bands like The Flock and Mahavishnu Orchestra. The album has a strong science fiction theme, as indicated by the album's title and song references to the well known eponymous book.

Track listing

Personnel

Styx
 Dennis DeYoung – vocals, keyboards
 Tommy Shaw – acoustic and electric guitars, mandolin, keyboards, vocals
 James "JY" Young – electric guitars, vocals
 Chuck Panozzo – bass guitar
 Todd Sucherman – drums, percussion

Additional personnel
 Jerry Goodman – violin
 David Campbell – string arrangements, conductor
 Ed Tossing – string arrangements, conductor
 C. J. Vanston – horn arrangements, conductor
 Glen Burtnik - bass guitar (uncredited)

Production
 Producers: Dennis DeYoung, Tommy Shaw, James Young
 Engineers: Rodney Amos, Craig Bauer, Andy Haller, John Hendrickson, Steve Johnson, Gary Loizzo, Keith Marks, Tommy Shaw, C.J. Vanston, Craig Williams
 Mixing: Craig Bauer, Dennis DeYoung, Gary Loizzo, Ron Nevison
 Mastering: Ted Jensen
 Sequencing: Tommy Shaw
 Programming: Tommy Shaw
 Pro-Tools: Patrick Thrasher
 Art direction: Alan Chappell, Ioannis
 Design: Alan Chappell, Ioannis
 Artwork: Ioannis

Charts
Album - Billboard (United States)

References

External links 

 Styx - Brave New World (1999) album review by ??, credits & releases at AllMusic.com
 Styx - Brave New World (1999) album releases & credits at Discogs.com
 Styx - Brave New World (1999) album to be listened as stream at Spotify.com

1999 albums
CMC International albums
Styx (band) albums